Platyagonum is a genus of ground beetles in the family Carabidae. There are at least two described species in Platyagonum, found in Japan.

Species
These two species belong to the genus Platyagonum:
 Platyagonum esakii (Habu, 1954)
 Platyagonum pseudamphinomus (Habu, 1974)

References

Platyninae